Chris Barlow (born December 12, 1961) is an American sprint canoer who competed in the early 1990s. He finished ninth in the K-4 1000 m event at the 1992 Summer Olympics in Barcelona. He is well renowned in the San Diego, CA area amongst the life guarding and fire fighting community.

References
Sports-Reference.com profile

1961 births
American male canoeists
Canoeists at the 1992 Summer Olympics
Living people
Olympic canoeists of the United States